Rosalia Annette Nghidinwa (26 October 1952 – 14 January 2018) was a Namibian politician.

Born in Nkurenkuru, Kavango Region, Nghidinwa joined SWAPO in 1974 at the age of 22. A health worker by profession, Nghidinwa ran several community health centres in the Okavango Region for the Evangelical Lutheran Church in Namibia (ELCIN). She represented the ELCIN at the Lutheran World Conference in 1987 and served on the Church's governing council from 1991 to 1996.

She was a member of the National Assembly of Namibia since 2000. She also entered cabinet of Namibia after being appointed deputy Minister of Labour and Social Welfare from 2000 to 2005. In 2005 she was promoted to Minister of Home Affairs and Immigration, and in December 2012 she was moved to head the Ministry of Gender Equality and Social Welfare (Namibia).

Nghidinwa was awarded the Most Excellent Order of the Eagle in 2003. She was married to Sam Nghidinwa who died in February 2009. They had 6 children. Nghidinwa died in a Windhoek hospital on 14 January 2018 after suffering from cancer.

References

1952 births
2018 deaths
Members of the National Assembly (Namibia)
People from Kavango Region
Namibian Lutherans
SWAPO politicians
Home affairs ministers of Namibia
Gender equality and social welfare ministers of Namibia
21st-century Namibian women politicians
21st-century Namibian politicians
Women government ministers of Namibia
Female interior ministers
Women members of the National Assembly (Namibia)
Deaths from cancer in Namibia
20th-century Lutherans